West Side Story is a musical conceived by Jerome Robbins with music by Leonard Bernstein, lyrics by Stephen Sondheim, and a book by Arthur Laurents.

Inspired by William Shakespeare's play Romeo and Juliet, the story is set in the mid-1950s in the Upper West Side of Manhattan in New York City, then a multiracial, blue-collar neighborhood. The musical explores the rivalry between the Jets and the Sharks, two teenage street gangs of different ethnic backgrounds. The Sharks, who are recent migrants from Puerto Rico, and the Jets, who are white, vie for dominance of the neighborhood, and the police try to keep order. The young protagonist, Tony, a former member of the Jets and best friend of the gang's leader, Riff, falls in love with Maria, the sister of Bernardo, the leader of the Sharks. The dark theme, sophisticated music, extended dance scenes, tragic love story, and focus on social problems marked a turning point in musical theatre.

The original 1957 Broadway production, directed and choreographed by Robbins, marked Sondheim's Broadway debut. It ran for 732 performances before going on tour. The production was nominated for six Tony Awards, including Best Musical, in 1958, winning two. The show had an even longer-running West End production, a number of revivals, and international productions. A 1961 musical film adaptation, co-directed by Robert Wise and Robbins, starred Natalie Wood and Richard Beymer. The film was nominated for eleven Academy Awards and won ten, including Best Picture. A 2021 film adaptation, directed by Steven Spielberg, starred Ansel Elgort and Rachel Zegler. That film was also nominated for the Academy Award for Best Picture, along with six additional nominations, winning one Oscar.

Background

Genesis
In 1949, Jerome Robbins approached Leonard Bernstein and Arthur Laurents about collaborating on a contemporary musical adaptation of Romeo and Juliet. He proposed that the plot focus on the conflict between an Irish Catholic family and a Jewish family living on the Lower East Side of Manhattan, during the Easter–Passover season. The girl has survived the Holocaust and emigrated from Israel; the conflict was to be centered on anti-Semitism of the Catholic "Jets" towards the Jewish "Emeralds" (a name that made its way into the script as a reference). Eager to write his first musical, Laurents immediately agreed. Bernstein wanted to present the material in operatic form, but Robbins and Laurents resisted the suggestion. They described the project as "lyric theater", and Laurents wrote a first draft he called East Side Story. Only after he completed it did the group realize it was little more than a musicalization of themes that had already been covered in plays like Abie's Irish Rose. When Robbins opted to drop out, the three men went their separate ways, and the piece was shelved for almost five years.

In 1955, theatrical producer Martin Gabel was working on a stage adaptation of the James M. Cain novel Serenade, about an opera singer who comes to the realization he is homosexual, and he invited Laurents to write the book. Laurents accepted and suggested Bernstein and Robbins join the creative team. Robbins felt if the three were going to join forces, they should return to East Side Story, and Bernstein agreed. Laurents, however, was committed to Gabel, who introduced him to the young composer/lyricist Stephen Sondheim. Sondheim auditioned by playing the score for Saturday Night, his musical that was scheduled to open in the fall. Laurents liked the lyrics but was not impressed with the music. Sondheim did not care for Laurents' opinion. Serenade ultimately was shelved.

Laurents was soon hired to write the screenplay for a remake of the 1934 Greta Garbo film The Painted Veil for Ava Gardner. While in Hollywood, he contacted Bernstein, who was in town conducting at the Hollywood Bowl. The two met at The Beverly Hills Hotel, and the conversation turned to juvenile delinquent gangs, a fairly recent social phenomenon that had received major coverage on the front pages of the morning newspapers due to a Chicano turf war. Bernstein suggested they rework East Side Story and set it in Los Angeles, but Laurents felt he was more familiar with Puerto Ricans in the United States and Harlem than he was with Mexican Americans and Olvera Street. The two contacted Robbins, who was enthusiastic about a musical with a Latin beat. He arrived in Hollywood to choreograph the dance sequences for the 1956 film The King and I, and he and Laurents began developing the musical while working on their respective projects, keeping in touch with Bernstein, who had returned to New York. When the producer of The Painted Veil replaced Gardner with Eleanor Parker and asked Laurents to revise his script with her in mind, he backed out of the film, freeing him to devote all his time to the stage musical. Bernstein and Laurents, who had been blacklisted for alleged communist activities, worked with Robbins even though he had cooperated with the House Un-American Activities Committee.

Collaboration and development
In New York City, Laurents went to the opening night party for a new play by Ugo Betti. There he met Sondheim, who had heard that East Side Story, now retitled West Side Story, was back on track. Bernstein had decided he needed to concentrate solely on the music, and he and Robbins had invited Betty Comden and Adolph Green to write the lyrics, but the team opted to work on Peter Pan instead. Laurents asked Sondheim if he would be interested in tackling the task. Initially he resisted, because he was determined to write the full score for his next project (Saturday Night had been scrapped). But Oscar Hammerstein convinced him that he would benefit from the experience, and he accepted. Meanwhile, Laurents had written a new draft of the book changing the characters' backgrounds: the male lead, once an Irish American, was now of Polish and Irish descent, and the formerly Jewish female lead had become Puerto Rican.

The original book Laurents wrote closely adhered to Romeo and Juliet, but the characters based on Shakespeare's Rosaline and the parents of the doomed lovers were eliminated early on. Later the scenes related to Juliet's faking her death and committing suicide also were deleted. Language posed a problem; profanity was uncommon in the theater at the time, and slang expressions were avoided for fear they would be dated by the time the production opened. Laurents ultimately invented what sounded like real street talk but actually was not: "cut the frabba-jabba", for example. Sondheim converted long passages of dialogue, and sometimes just a simple phrase like "A boy like that would kill your brother", into lyrics. With the help of Oscar Hammerstein, Laurents convinced Bernstein and Sondheim to move "One Hand, One Heart", which he considered too pristine for the balcony scene, to the scene set in the bridal shop, and as a result "Tonight" was written to replace it. Laurents felt that the building tension needed to be alleviated in order to increase the impact of the play's tragic outcome, so comic relief in the form of Officer Krupke was added to the second act. He was outvoted on other issues: he felt the lyrics to "America" and "I Feel Pretty" were too witty for the characters singing them, but they stayed in the score and proved to be audience favorites. Another song, "Kid Stuff", was added and quickly removed during the Washington, D.C., tryout when Laurents convinced the others it was helping tip the balance of the show into typical musical comedy.

Bernstein composed West Side Story and Candide concurrently, which led to some switches of material between the two works. Tony and Maria's duet, "One Hand, One Heart", was originally intended for Cunegonde in Candide. The music of "Gee, Officer Krupke" was pulled from the Venice scene in Candide. Laurents explained the style that the creative team finally decided on:

The show was nearly complete in the fall of 1956, but almost everyone on the creative team needed to fulfill other commitments first. Robbins was involved with Bells Are Ringing, then Bernstein with Candide, and in January 1957 A Clearing in the Woods, Laurents' latest play, opened and quickly closed. When a backers' audition failed to raise any money for West Side Story late in the spring of 1957, only two months before the show was to begin rehearsals, producer Cheryl Crawford pulled out of the project. Every other producer had already turned down the show, deeming it too dark and depressing. Bernstein was despondent, but Sondheim convinced his friend Hal Prince, who was in Boston overseeing the out-of-town tryout of the new George Abbott musical New Girl in Town, to read the script. He liked it but decided to ask Abbott, his longtime mentor, for his opinion, and Abbott advised him to turn it down. Prince, aware that Abbott was the primary reason New Girl was in trouble, decided to ignore him, and he and his producing partner Robert Griffith flew to New York to hear the score. In his memoirs, Prince recalled: "Sondheim and Bernstein sat at the piano playing through the music, and soon I was singing along with them".

Production period

Prince began cutting the budget and raising money. Robbins then announced he did not want to choreograph the show, but changed his mind when Prince agreed to an eight-week dance rehearsal period (instead of the customary four), since there was to be more dancing in West Side Story than in any previous Broadway show, and allowed Robbins to hire Peter Gennaro as his assistant. Originally, when considering the cast, Laurents wanted James Dean for the lead role of Tony, but the actor soon died. Sondheim found Larry Kert and Chita Rivera, who created the roles of Tony and Anita, respectively. Getting the work on stage was still not easy. Bernstein said:

Throughout the rehearsal period, the New York newspapers were filled with articles about gang warfare, keeping the show's plot timely. Robbins kept the cast members playing the Sharks and the Jets separate in order to discourage them from socializing with each other and reminded everyone of the reality of gang violence by posting news stories on the bulletin board backstage. Robbins wanted a gritty realism from his sneaker- and jeans-clad cast. He gave the ensemble more freedom than Broadway dancers had previously been given to interpret their roles, and the dancers were thrilled to be treated like actors instead of just choreographed bodies. As the rehearsals wore on, Bernstein fought to keep his score together, as other members of the team called on him to cut out more and more of the sweeping or complex "operatic" passages. Columbia Records initially declined to record the cast album, saying the score was too depressing and too difficult.

There were problems with Oliver Smith's designs. His painted backdrops were stunning, but the sets were, for the most part, either shabby looking or too stylized. Prince refused to spend money on new construction, and Smith was obliged to improve what he had as best he could with very little money to do it. The pre-Broadway run in Washington, D.C., was a critical and commercial success, although none of the reviews mentioned Sondheim, listed as co-lyricist, who was overshadowed by the better-known Bernstein. Bernstein magnanimously removed his name as co-author of the lyrics, although Sondheim was uncertain he wanted to receive sole credit for what he considered to be overly florid contributions by Bernstein. Robbins demanded and received a "Conceived by" credit, and used it to justify his making major decisions regarding changes in the show without consulting the others. As a result, by opening night on Broadway, none of his collaborators were talking to him.

It has been rumored that while Bernstein was off trying to fix the musical Candide, Sondheim wrote some of the music for West Side Story, and that Bernstein's co-lyricist billing mysteriously disappeared from the credits of West Side Story during the tryout, presumably as a trade-off. However, Steven Suskin writes in Show Tunes that "as the writing progressed and the extent of Bernstein's lyric contributions became less, the composer agreed to rescind his credit. ... Contrary to rumor, Sondheim did not write music for the show; his only contribution came on 'Something's Coming'", where he developed the main strain of the chorus from music Bernstein wrote for the verse.

Synopsis

Act 1
Two rival teenage gangs, the Jets (white Americans) and the Sharks (Puerto Ricans), struggle for control of their neighborhood on the Upper West Side of Manhattan (Prologue). Police officers Krupke and Lt. Schrank warn them to stop fighting on their beat. The police chase the Sharks off, and then the Jets plan how they can assure their continued dominance of the street. The Jets' leader, Riff, suggests setting up a rumble with the Sharks. He plans to make the challenge to Bernardo, the Sharks' leader, that night at the neighborhood dance. Riff wants to convince his best friend and former member of the Jets, Tony, to meet the Jets at the dance. Some of the Jets are unsure of his loyalty, but Riff is adamant that Tony is still one of them ("Jet Song"). Riff meets Tony while he's working at Doc's Drugstore to persuade him to come. Tony initially refuses, but Riff wins him over. Tony is convinced that something important is round the corner ("Something's Coming").

Maria works in a bridal shop with Anita, the girlfriend of her brother, Bernardo. Maria has just arrived from Puerto Rico for her arranged marriage to Chino, a friend of Bernardo's. Maria confesses to Anita that she is not in love with Chino. Anita makes Maria a dress to wear to the neighborhood dance.

At the dance, after introductions, the teenagers begin to dance; soon a challenge dance is called ("Dance at the Gym"), during which Tony and Maria (who aren't taking part in the challenge dance) see each other across the room and are drawn to each other. They dance together, forgetting the tension in the room, and fall in love, but Bernardo pulls his sister from Tony and sends her home. Riff and Bernardo agree to meet for a War Council at Doc's, a drug store which is considered neutral ground, but meanwhile, an infatuated and happy Tony finds Maria's building and serenades her outside her bedroom ("Maria"). She appears on her fire escape, and the two profess their love for one another ("Tonight"). Meanwhile, Anita, Rosalia, and the other Shark girls discuss the differences between the territory of Puerto Rico and the mainland United States of America, with Anita defending America, and Rosalia yearning for Puerto Rico ("America").

The Jets get antsy while waiting for the Sharks inside Doc's drugstore. Riff helps them let out their aggression ("Cool"). The Sharks arrive to discuss weapons to use in the rumble. Tony suggests "a fair fight" (fists only), which the leaders agree to, despite the other members' protests. Bernardo believes that he will fight Tony, but must settle for fighting Diesel, Riff's second-in-command, instead. This is followed by a monologue by the ineffective Lt. Schrank trying to find out the location of the rumble. Tony tells Doc about Maria. Doc is worried for them while Tony is convinced that nothing can go wrong; he is in love.

The next day, Maria is in a very happy mood at the bridal shop, as she anticipates seeing Tony again, but she is dismayed when she learns about the upcoming rumble from Anita. When Tony arrives, Maria insists that he must stop the fight altogether, which he agrees to do. Before he goes, they dream of their wedding ("One Hand, One Heart"). Tony, Maria, Anita, Bernardo and the Sharks, and Riff and the Jets all anticipate the events to come that night ("Tonight Quintet"). The gangs meet under the highway and, as the fight between Bernardo and Diesel begins, Tony arrives and tries to stop it. Though Bernardo taunts and provokes Tony, ridiculing his attempt to make peace, Tony keeps his composure. When Bernardo pushes Tony, Riff punches him in Tony's defense. The two draw their switchblades and get in a fight ("The Rumble"). Tony attempts to intervene, inadvertently leading to Riff being fatally stabbed by Bernardo. Tony kills Bernardo in a fit of rage, which in turn provokes an all-out fight like the fight in the Prologue. The sound of approaching police sirens is heard, and everyone scatters, except Tony, who stands in shock at what he has done. The tomboy Anybodys, who stubbornly wishes that she could become a Jet, tells Tony to flee from the scene at the last moment and flees with the knives. Only the bodies of Riff and Bernardo remain.

Act 2

Blissfully unaware that the rumble has taken place with fatal consequences, Maria giddily sings to her friends Rosalia, Teresita, and Francisca that she is in love ("I Feel Pretty"). Chino brings the news that Tony has killed Bernardo, then leaves. Maria prays that what he has told her is a lie. Tony arrives to see Maria and she initially pounds on his chest with rage, but she still loves him. They plan to run away together. As the walls of Maria's bedroom disappear, they find themselves in a dreamlike world of peace ("Somewhere").

Two of the Jets, A-Rab and Baby John, are set on by Officer Krupke, but they manage to escape him. They meet the rest of the gang. To cheer themselves up, they lampoon Krupke and the other adults who don't understand them ("Gee, Officer Krupke"). Anybodys arrives and tells the Jets that she has been spying on the Puerto Ricans; she has discovered that Chino has a gun and is looking for Tony. The gang separates to find Tony and protect him. Action has taken charge; he accepts Anybodys into the Jets and includes her in the search.

A grieving Anita arrives at Maria's apartment. As Tony leaves, he tells Maria to meet him at Doc's so they can run away to the country. In spite of her attempts to conceal it, Anita sees that Tony has been with Maria, and launches an angry tirade against him ("A Boy Like That"). Maria counters by telling Anita how powerful love is ("I Have a Love"), and Anita realizes that Maria loves Tony as much as she had loved Bernardo. She admits that Chino has a gun and is looking for Tony. Lt. Schrank arrives to question Maria about her brother's death, and Anita agrees to go to Doc's to tell Tony to wait. Unfortunately, the Jets, who have found Tony, have congregated at Doc's, and they taunt Anita with racist slurs and eventually attempt rape. Doc arrives and stops them. Furious, Anita spitefully delivers the wrong message, telling the Jets that Chino has shot Maria dead.

Doc relates the news to Tony, who has been dreaming of heading to the countryside to have children with Maria. Feeling there is no longer anything to live for, Tony leaves to find Chino, begging for him to shoot him as well. Just as Tony sees Maria alive, Chino arrives and shoots Tony. The Jets, Sharks, and adults flock around the lovers. Maria holds Tony in her arms (and sings a quiet, brief reprise of "Somewhere") as he dies. Angry at the death of another friend, the Jets move towards the Sharks but Maria takes Chino's gun and tells everyone that "all of [them]" killed Tony and the others because of their hate for each other, and, "Now I can kill too, because now I have hate!" she yells. However, she is unable to bring herself to fire the gun and drops it, crying in grief. Gradually, all the members of both gangs assemble on either side of Tony's body, showing that the feud is over. The Jets and Sharks form a procession, and together carry Tony away, with Maria the last one in the procession.

Characters

The Jets
Riff, the leader
Tony, Riff's best friend
Diesel, Riff's lieutenant
Action, A-Rab, Baby John, Big Deal, Gee-Tar, Mouthpiece, Snowboy, Tiger and Anybodys

The Jet Girls
Velma, Riff's girlfriend
Graziella, Diesel's girlfriend
Minnie, Clarice and Pauline

The Sharks
Bernardo, the leader
Chino, Bernardo's best friend
Pepe, second-in-command
Indio, Luis, Anxious, Nibbles, Juano, Toro and Moose

The Shark Girls
Maria, Bernardo's sister
Anita, Bernardo's girlfriend
Rosalia, Consuelo, Teresita, Francisca, Estella and Marguerita

The Adults
Doc, owner of the local drugstore/soda shop
Schrank, racist local police lieutenant
Krupke, neighborhood cop and Schrank's right-hand man
Glad Hand, well-meaning social worker in charge of the dance

Cast

Musical numbers

Act 1
"Prologue" – Orchestra, danced by Jets & Sharks
"Jet Song" – Riff & Jets
"Something's Coming" – Tony
"The Dance at the Gym" – Orchestra, danced by Jets & Sharks
"Maria" – Tony
"Tonight" – Tony & Maria
"America" – Anita, Rosalia & Shark Girls
"Cool" – Riff & Jets
"One Hand, One Heart" – Tony & Maria
"Tonight (Quintet & Chorus)" – Riff, Jets, Bernardo, Sharks, Anita, Tony & Maria
"The Rumble" – Orchestra, danced by Riff, Bernardo, Sharks & Jets

Act 2
"I Feel Pretty" – Maria, Rosalia, Teresita & Francisca
"Somewhere" – Consuelo, danced by Company
"Procession and Nightmare" – Tony, Maria & Ensemble
"Gee, Officer Krupke" – Action, Snowboy & Jets
"A Boy Like That / I Have a Love" – Anita & Maria
"Finale" – Tony, Maria & Company

Notes
In the 1964 and 1980 revivals, "Somewhere" was sung by Francisca rather than Consuelo.
In the 2009 revival, "Cool" was performed by Riff, the Jets, and the Jet Girls. "I Feel Pretty" was sung in Spanish as "" and "A Boy Like That" was sung in Spanish as "". They were changed back to their English lyrics midway through the run. "Somewhere" was sung by Kiddo, a young Jet.

Productions

Original Broadway production

After tryouts in Washington, D.C., and Philadelphia beginning in August 1957, the original Broadway production opened at the Winter Garden Theatre on September 26, to positive reviews. The production was directed and choreographed by Jerome Robbins, orchestrated by Sid Ramin and Irwin Kostal, and produced by Robert E. Griffith and Harold Prince, with lighting designed by Jean Rosenthal. The cast starred Larry Kert as Tony, Carol Lawrence as Maria, Chita Rivera as Anita and David Winters as Baby John. The other notable cast members in the original production were: Riff: Michael Callan, A-Rab: Tony Mordente, Big Deal: Martin Charnin, Gee-Tar: Tommy Abbott, Chino: Jamie Sanchez, Rosalia: Marilyn Cooper, Consuela: Reri Grist, Doc: Art Smith and Francisca: Elizabeth Taylor. The production closed on June 27, 1959, after 732 performances. Robbins won the Tony Award for Best Choreographer, and Oliver Smith won the Tony for Best Scenic Designer. Also nominated were Carol Lawrence as Best Actress in a Supporting Role in a Musical, Max Goberman as Best Musical Director and Conductor, and Irene Sharaff for Best Costume Design. Carol Lawrence received the 1958 Theatre World Award.

The production's national tour was launched on July 1, 1959, in Denver and then played in Los Angeles, San Francisco, Chicago, Detroit, Cincinnati, Cleveland, Baltimore, Philadelphia, and Boston. It returned to the Winter Garden Theater in New York in April 1960 for another 249 performance engagement, closing in December.

UK productions
A 1958 production at the Manchester Opera House transferred to London, where it opened at Her Majesty's Theatre in the West End on December 12, and ran until June 1961 with a total of 1,039 performances. Robbins directed and choreographed, and it was co-choreographed by Peter Gennaro, with scenery by Oliver Smith. Featured performers were George Chakiris, who won an Academy Award as Bernardo in the 1961 film version, as Riff, Marlys Watters as Maria, Don McKay as Tony, and Chita Rivera reprising her Broadway role as Anita. David Holliday, who had been playing Gladhand since the London opening, took over as Tony.

The refurbished Shaftesbury Theatre reopened with a run of West Side Story from December 19, 1974, to mid-1975. It was directed by Bill Kenwright, choreographed by Roger Finch, and starred Lionel Morton as Tony and Christiana Matthews as Maria. A London production originated at Leicester Haymarket Theatre in early 1984 and transferred on May 16, to Her Majesty's Theatre. It closed on September 28, 1985. The 1980 Broadway production was recreated by Tom Abbott. The cast starred Steven Pacey as Tony and Jan Hartley as Maria. Maxine Gordon was Anybodys.

A UK national tour started in 1997 and starred David Habbin as Tony, Katie Knight Adams as Maria and Anna-Jane Casey as Anita. The production transferred to London's West End opening at the Prince Edward Theatre in October 1998, transferring to the Prince of Wales Theatre where it closed in January 2000. The production subsequently toured the UK for a second time.

A production at the Curve Theatre, starring Jamie Muscato as Tony and Adriana Ivelisse as Maria, ran from November 23, 2019, to January 11, 2020.

1980 Broadway revival
A Broadway revival opened at the Minskoff Theatre on February 14, 1980, and closed on November 30, after 333 performances. It was directed and choreographed by Robbins, with the book scenes co-directed by Gerald Freedman; produced by Gladys Nederlander and Tom Abbott; Lee Theodore assisted in the choreography reproduction. The original scenic, lighting, and costume designs were used. It starred Ken Marshall as Tony, Josie de Guzman as Maria and Debbie Allen as Anita. Both de Guzman and Allen received Tony Award nominations as Best Featured Actress in a Musical, and the musical was nominated as Best Reproduction (Play or Musical). Allen won the Drama Desk Award as Outstanding Featured Actress in a Musical. Other notable cast members included Brent Barrett as Diesel, Harolyn Blackwell as Francisca, Stephen Bogardus as Mouth Piece and Reed Jones as Big Deal.

The Minskoff production subsequently opened the Nervi Festival in Genoa, Italy, in July 1981 with Josie de Guzman as Maria and Brent Barrett as Tony.

2009 Broadway revival
In 2007, Arthur Laurents stated: "I've come up with a way of doing [West Side Story] that will make it absolutely contemporary without changing a word or a note". He directed a pre-Broadway production of West Side Story at the National Theatre in Washington, D.C., that ran from December 15, 2008, through January 17, 2009. The Broadway revival began previews at the Palace Theatre on February 23, 2009, and opened on March 19. The production wove Spanish lyrics and dialogue into the English libretto. The translations are by Tony Award winner Lin-Manuel Miranda. Laurents said: "The musical theatre and cultural conventions of 1957 made it next to impossible for the characters to have authenticity. Every member of both gangs was always a potential killer even then. Now they actually will be. Only Tony and Maria try to live in a different world". In August 2009, some of the lyrics for "A Boy Like That" ("Un Hombre Asi") and "I Feel Pretty" ("Me Siento Hermosa"), which were previously sung in Spanish in the revival, were changed back to the original English. The Spanish lyrics sung by the Sharks in the "Tonight" (Quintet) remained in Spanish.
The cast featured Matt Cavenaugh as Tony, Josefina Scaglione as Maria, and Karen Olivo as Anita. Olivo won the Tony Award for Best Featured Actress, while Scaglione was nominated for the award for Leading Actress. The cast recording won the Grammy Award for Best Musical Show Album. In July 2010, the producers reduced the size of the orchestra, replacing five musicians with an off-stage synthesizer. The production closed on January 2, 2011, after 748 performances and 27 previews. The revival sold 1,074,462 tickets on Broadway over the course of nearly two years and was a financial success.

2020 Broadway revival

A Broadway revival of West Side Story began previews on December 10, 2019, and officially opened on February 20, 2020, at the Broadway Theatre. It was directed by Ivo van Hove, with choreography by Anne Teresa De Keersmaeker and was produced by Scott Rudin, Barry Diller and David Geffen. The cast included Shereen Pimentel as Maria, Isaac Cole Powell as Tony, Amar Ramasar as Bernardo, Thomas Jay Ryan as Lt. Schrank and Yesenia Ayala as Anita. Scenic and lighting design were by Jan Versweyveld, with costumes by An d'Huys.

The production cut the song "I Feel Pretty" and trimmed the book to one hour and forty-five minutes (with no intermission). The setting was "loosely updated to the present", and direction was "determined to snuff out any lightness that might temper the full-blown tragedy to come". The original balletic, finger snapping choreography was replaced by swaggering, hip-hop and latin-influenced dancing. The set consisted mostly of large screens featuring video, several cast members carried iPhones, and the Jets were not all white. Some theatergoers felt that the set turned the theatre into a cinema, but critic Charles McNulty argued that it wove technology into a multimedia "performance work that defies our usual vocabulary". The production also drew criticism for its casting of Ramasar, who had been accused of sexually inappropriate behavior and was fired from the New York City Ballet and suspended from Carousel, as well as the graphic staging of the Jets' assault and attempted rape of Anita which, together, "sends a message that women’s bodies are collateral damage in male artistic success". Van Hove's casting of African American Jets, "dangerously, shifts our focus away from the enduring problem of white supremacist violence". While praising the cast, except for Ramasar, Alexandra Schwartz, writing in The New Yorker, felt that the use of the videos "dwarfs the actors with their own gigantic images... the technique is banal", while the mixed casting of the Jets creates "a bitter, unintended irony in the context of African-American history".

March 11, 2020, was the show's last performance before production was suspended due to the COVID-19 pandemic. Because of its opening date, it was not eligible for 2020 Tony Award consideration. The production did not reopen, and so its total run was 78 previews and 24 performances.

Other notable US productions and tours
The New York City Center Light Opera Company production played for a limited engagement of 31 performances from April 8 to May 3, 1964. The cast featured Don McKay (Tony), Julia Migenes (Maria) and Luba Lisa (Anita). It was staged by Gerald Freedman with choreography re-mounted by Tom Abbott. The Musical Theater of Lincoln Center and Richard Rodgers production opened at the New York State Theater, Lincoln Center, in June 1968 and closed in September after 89 performances. Direction and choreography were reproduced by Lee Theodore, and scenery was by Oliver Smith. Tony was played by Kurt Peterson, with Victoria Mallory as Maria. A 1987 U.S. tour starred Jack Wagner as Tony, with Valarie Pettiford as Anita and was directed by Alan Johnson.

A national tour, directed by Alan Johnson, was produced in 2002. A national tour of the 2009 Broadway revival began in October 2010 at the Fisher Theatre in Detroit, Michigan, and toured for two seasons. The cast featured Kyle Harris as Tony and Ali Ewoldt as Maria.

The musical has also been adapted to be performed as Deaf Side Story using both English and American Sign Language, with deaf Sharks and hearing Jets.

International productions
The first Australian production opened in October 1960 at the Princess Theatre in Melbourne, before touring to the Tivoli Theatre in Sydney in February 1961. Subsequent Australian tours have been staged in 1983, 1994, 2010 and 2019.<ref>James, Erin. [https://aussietheatre.com.au/news/opera-australia-will-present-two-different-productions-of-west-side-story-in-2019 West Side Story in 2019"] , Aussietheatre.com.au, July 20, 2018, accessed September 20, 2019</ref> In 1961, a tour of Israel, Africa and the Near East was mounted. In 1962, the West End (H. M. Tennent) production launched a five-month Scandinavian tour to Copenhagen, Oslo, Gothenburg, Stockholm and Helsinki. Robert Jeffrey took over from David Holliday as Tony, and Jill Martin played Maria.

Staatstheater Nürnberg staged a production in Germany from 1972 in a German translation by Marcel Prawy, starring Barry Hanner as Tony and Glenda Glayzer as Maria. The production continued for over a year. In 1977, a Spanish adaptation, Amor Sin Barreras, was produced in Mexico City by Alfonso Rosas Prigo and Ruben Boido, with direction by Ruben Boido, at the Hidalgo Theater. Gualberto Castro played Tony; Maria Medina was Maria; another cast member was Macaria. From 1982 to 1984 a tour of South America, Israel and Europe was directed by Jay Norman and choreographed by Lee Theodore, veterans of the original Broadway cast. The Japanese Takarazuka Revue has performed the show twice. It was produced by the Moon Troupe in 1998 and again in 1999 by the Star Troupe.

A 2000 Hong Kong production with Cantonese lyrics featured Paul Wong as Tony at the outdoor plaza of Hong Kong Cultural Centre. Canada's Stratford Shakespeare Festival performed West Side Story in 1999, starring Tyley Ross as Tony and Ma-Anne Dionisio as Maria, and again in 2009, The Austrian Bregenz Festival presented the musical in the German translation by Prawy in 2003 and 2004, directed by Francesca Zambello, followed by a German tour. An international tour (2005–2010), directed and choreographed by Joey McKneely played in Tokyo, Paris, Austria, Switzerland, Germany, Singapore, São Paulo, France, Taiwan, China, Italy, Rotterdam and Spain.Loveridge, Lizzie. " 'West Side Story' 50th Anniversary Production" , Curtain Up, August 1, 2008, accessed August 17, 2008

Novosibirsk Globus Theatre staged the musical in Russia in 2007 with conductor Keith Clark, a former pupil of Bernstein's, who also conducted the 2010 Moscow production. A French language adaptation, translated by Philippe Gobeille, opened in Montreal, Quebec, in March 2008. A Philippine version played in 2008 at the Meralco Theater. It featured Christian Bautista as Tony, Karylle and Joanna Ampil as Maria. In 2011, a Lima production was produced by "Preludio Asociación Cultural" with Marco Zunino as Tony, Rossana Fernández-Maldonado as Maria, Jesús Neyra as Bernardo, Tati Alcántara as Anita and Joaquín de Orbegoso as Riff.

A Japanese production ran from November 2019 to January 2020, at the IHI Stage Around Tokyo, featuring a double cast with Mamoru Miyano and Shouta Aoi as Tony, and Kii Kitano and Rena Sasamoto as Maria, with Suzuko Mimori as Anita, Ryuji Kamiyama as Riff, and Masataka Nakagauchi as Bernardo.

A South Korean production is set to run from November 2022 to February 2023 at the Chungmu Art Center in Seoul.  Kim Junsu, Go Eunsung, and Park Kanghyun are cast as Tony, with Lee Jisoo and Han Jae-ah as Maria and Jung Taekwoon as Riff.

Critical reaction
The creators' innovations in dance, music and theatrical style drew enthusiastic reactions from the critics. Walter Kerr wrote in the New York Herald Tribune on September 27, 1957:

The other reviews generally joined in speculation about how the new work would influence the course of musical theater. Typical was John Chapman's review in the New York Daily News on September 27, 1957, headed: "West Side Story a Splendid and Super-Modern Musical Drama".Time magazine found the dance and gang warfare more compelling than the love story and noted that the show's "putting choreography foremost, may prove a milestone in musical-drama history". One writer noted: "The story appealed to society's undercurrent of rebellion from authority that surfaced in 1950s films like Rebel Without a Cause. ... Robbins' energetic choreography and Bernstein's grand score accentuated the satiric, hard-edged lyrics of Sondheim, and Laurents' capture of the angry voice of urban youth. The play was criticized for glamorizing gangs, and its portrayal of Puerto Ricans and lack of authentic Latin casting were weaknesses. Yet, the same writer commented, the song "America" shows the triumph of the spirit over the obstacles often faced by immigrants. The musical also made points in its description of troubled youth and the devastating effects of poverty and racism. Juvenile delinquency is seen as an ailment of society: "No one wants a fella with a social disease!" The writer concluded: "On the cusp of the 1960s, American society, still recovering from the enormous upheaval of World War II, was seeking stability and control".

Score
Bernstein's score for West Side Story blends "jazz, Latin rhythms, symphonic sweep and musical-comedy conventions in groundbreaking ways for Broadway". It was orchestrated by Sid Ramin and Irwin Kostal following detailed instructions from Bernstein, who then wrote revisions on their manuscript (the original, heavily annotated by Ramin, Kostal and Bernstein, is in the Rare Books and Manuscripts Library at Columbia University). Ramin, Kostal and Bernstein are billed as orchestrators for the show. The original orchestra consisted of 31 players: a large Broadway pit orchestra enhanced to include 5 percussionists, a guitarist and a piano/celesta player.

In 1960, Bernstein prepared a suite of orchestral music from the show, titled Symphonic Dances from West Side Story. It consists of nine movements: Prologue (Allegro moderato), "Somewhere" (Adagio), Scherzo (Vivace e leggiero), Mambo (Meno presto), Cha-Cha (Andantino con grazia), Meeting Scene (Meno mosso), "Cool" Fugue (Allegretto), Rumble (Molto allegro), Finale (Adagio); it was premiered on February 13, 1961, in Carnegie Hall with the New York Philharmonic conducted by Lukas Foss. The suite was later included as bonus tracks on the original Broadway cast recording.

Analysis of the book

As in Romeo and Juliet, the love between members of two rival groups in West Side Story leads to violent confrontations "and a tragic ending with an underlying message: Violence breeds violence, so make peace and learn to share turf". Among the social themes explored in the musical are "bigotry, cultural misunderstanding and the social failure to fully integrate and empower young people in constructive ways".

Recordings

Recordings of West Side Story include the following:
 The 1957 original Broadway cast album, with Carol Lawrence as Maria, Larry Kert as Tony and Chita Rivera as Anita.
 A 1959 recording by the pianist André Previn comprised jazz versions of eight songs from the musical.
 The 1961 movie soundtrack, with Marni Nixon as Maria and Jimmy Bryant as Tony. It won the Grammy Award for Best Sound Track Album or Recording of Original Cast from Motion Picture or Television. The 1992 remastered re-release of this album included the "Overture", the "End Credits" music, the complete "Dance at the Gym" and dialogue from the film. The 2004 re-release added the "Intermission" music.
 In 1961, Cal Tjader released a jazz version, arranged by Clare Fischer, on Fantasy Records. The album was re-released in 2002 as Cal Tjader Plays Harold Arlen & West Side Story (double CD).
 In 1961, Stan Kenton recorded Kenton's West Side Story (a jazz version) that received a 1962 Grammy Award for Best Jazz Performance – Large Group (Instrumental).
 In 1962, Oscar Peterson and his trio recorded a jazz version, West Side Story.
 In 1962, Dave Brubeck recorded jazz versions of selections from the film score on Music from West Side Story.
 In 1963, Bill Barron recorded West Side Story Bossa Nova (Dauntless, 1963)
 In 1984, Bernstein conducted a studio recording of the musical; he had not conducted it before. The recording stars Kiri Te Kanawa as Maria, José Carreras as Tony, Tatiana Troyanos as Anita, Kurt Ollmann as Riff, and Marilyn Horne as the offstage voice who sings "Somewhere". It won a Grammy Award for Best Musical Theater Album in 1986. The recording process was filmed as a documentary, The Making of West Side Story, by the BBC for Unitel, produced by Humphrey Burton and directed by Christopher Swann. The documentary and its director won the 1986 Robert Flaherty Documentary Award (Television) and a Prix Italia. It was also nominated for an Emmy in the category "Outstanding Classical Program in the Performing Arts".
 A 1993 recording on the TER label, the first recording to document the full score including the overture, performed by Britain's National Symphony Orchestra, using cast members of the 1992 Leicester Haymarket Theatre production, conducted by John Owen Edwards.
 In 1996, RCA Victor released the tribute album The Songs of West Side Story featuring new versions of the songs from the musical sung by popular music stars, including: "The Jet Song" sung by Brian Setzer; "Cool" sung by Patti Austin, Mervyn Warren, and Bruce Hornsby; "A Boy Like That" sung by Selena; "I feel Pretty" sung by Little Richard; two versions of "Somewhere" performed by Aretha Franklin and Phil Collins; "Tonight" sung by Wynonna Judd and Kenny Loggins; "America" sung by Patti LaBelle, Natalie Cole and Sheila E.; "I Have a Love" sung by Trisha Yearwood; and "Rumble" performed by Chick Corea Elektric Band and Steve Vai's Monsters. Proceeds from the sale of this album benefit the Leonard Bernstein Education Through The Arts Fund, the NARAS Foundation and The Leonard Bernstein Center at Nashville, Tennessee.
 In 2002, Naxos Records released a CD, West Side Story (The Original Score), with Kenneth Schermerhorn conducting the Nashville Symphony orchestra and Mike Eldred as Tony.
 A 2007 tribute album entitled A Place for Us marking the 50th anniversary of the show. The album features cover versions previously recorded and a new recording of "Tonight" by Kristin Chenoweth and Hugh Panaro.
 A 2007 recording was released by Decca Broadway in honor of the musical's 50th anniversary. This album features Hayley Westenra as Maria and Vittorio Grigolo as Tony. The Bernstein Foundation in New York authorized the recording. It was nominated for the Grammy Award for Best Show Album.
 Bernstein recorded the Symphonic Dances suite with the New York Philharmonic in 1961, and with the Los Angeles Philharmonic in 1983. The Symphonic Dances have entered the repertoire of many major world orchestras. It has been recorded by many orchestras, including the San Francisco Symphony under the direction of Seiji Ozawa in 1972.
 The 2009 Broadway cast album, with Josefina Scaglione as Maria, Matt Cavenaugh as Tony and Karen Olivo as Anita won the 2010 Grammy Award for Best Musical Theater Album.
 A live 2013 recording by the San Francisco Symphony under Music Director Michael Tilson Thomas, featuring Cheyenne Jackson and Alexandra Silber, debuted at No.1 on the Billboard Classical Albums chart in May 2014. It was released that year as a hybrid SACD on the SFS Media label and was nominated for a Grammy for Best Musical Theater Album.
 The 2021 movie soundtrack, with Rachel Zegler as Maria, Ansel Elgort as Tony and Ariana DeBose as Anita. Rita Moreno as Valentina (she was Anita in the 1961 film), sings "Somewhere". It includes a version of "La Borinqueña" sung by David Alvarez (Bernardo) and the Sharks.

Films

The 1961 film adaptation of the musical received praise from critics and the public and became the second-highest-grossing film of the year in the United States. The film won ten Academy Awards in its eleven nominated categories, including Best Picture. It received the most Academy Awards (10 wins) of any musical film, including Best Picture. Rita Moreno, as Anita, was the first Latina actress ever to win an Oscar. The soundtrack album won a Grammy Award and was ranked No. 1 on the Billboard chart for a record 54 weeks. Differences in the film from the stage version include moving "Tonight" to follow "America" and "I Feel Pretty" to precede the rumble. Diesel is renamed Ice. "Gee, Officer Krupke" is moved before "Cool" and is sung by Riff instead of Action, and "Cool" is sung by Ice instead of Riff. After Riff is killed, Ice takes control of the Jets, rather than Action.

A 2021 film adaptation, written by Tony Kushner, directed by Steven Spielberg and choreographed by Justin Peck, is based more closely on the Broadway musical than the 1961 film. The cast includes Ansel Elgort as Tony, newcomer Rachel Zegler as Maria, Ariana DeBose as Anita and Mike Faist as Riff. Moreno, who played Anita in the 1961 film, plays Valentina, a reconceived and expanded version of the character Doc, who serves as a mentor to the teenage characters, and sings "Somewhere" in this version. A new Black character, Abe, makes the cast "more representative of ... 1950s New York". Peck's choreography does not attempt to replicate Robbins' choreography. "Gee, Officer Krupke" and "Cool" are performed in the first half; "One Hand, One Heart" appears in between the two. The film received seven nominations at the 94th Academy Awards, including Best Picture, winning one Oscar for DeBose's performance.

References in popular culture
The television show Curb Your Enthusiasm extensively referenced West Side Story in the 2009 season seven episode "Officer Krupke". In the third season of the series Glee, three episodes feature characters auditioning, rehearsing and performing a school production of West Side Story.Cerasaro, Pat. "World Premiere Exclusive: Glee Takes On West Side Story's 'Something's Coming' With Darren Criss" , BroadwayWorld.com, September 26, 2011, accessed October 4, 2016 The 2005 short musical comedy film West Bank Story, which won the Academy Award for Best Live Action Short Film, concerns a love story between a Jew and a Palestinian and parodies several aspects of West Side Story.

In 1963, the magazine Mad published "East Side Story" which was set at the United Nations building on the East Side of Manhattan, a parody of the Cold War, with the two rival gangs led by John F. Kennedy and Nikita Khrushchev, by writer Frank Jacobs and illustrator Mort Drucker. In the Discworld series of books by Terry Pratchett, two feuding noble families are named Selachii and Venturi, the scientific names for "sharks" and "jets".

From 1973 to 2004, Wild Side Story, a camp parody musical, based loosely on West Side Story and adapting parts of the musical's music and lyrics, was performed a total of more than 500 times in Miami Beach, Florida, Stockholm, Gran Canaria and Los Angeles. The show lampoons the musical's tragic love story, and also lip-synching and drag shows.

Awards and nominations
Original Broadway production

1964 Broadway revival

1980 Broadway revival

2009 Broadway revival

 2020 Broadway revival 

References

Sources
 
 

Further reading
 Acevedo-Munoz, Ernesto R. (2013) "West Side Story" as Cinema: The Making and Impact of an American Masterpiece, University Press of Kansas
 Bauch, Marc A. (2013) Europäische Einflüsse im amerikanischen Musical, Marburg, Germany: Tectum Verlag, 
 
 Simeone, Nigel (2009) Leonard Bernstein: West Side Story, Ashgate, Farnham, 
 Vaill, A. (2006) Somewhere: The Life of Jerome Robbins, Broadway Books, New York, 
 Wells, Elizabeth A. (2010) West Side Story: Cultural Perspectives on an American Musical, Scarecrow Press, Lanham, Maryland, 
 Williams, Mary E. (editor) (2001) Readings on West Side Story'', Greenhaven Press, San Diego, California,

External links

West Side Story at the Music Theatre International website
West Side Story, extensive material at stageagent.com
Twelve Jazz Versions of West Side Story at Jazz.com
NYC Youth Gangs – 1950s

1957 musicals
American plays adapted into films
Broadway musicals
Modern adaptations of works by William Shakespeare
Musicals based on plays
Musicals by Leonard Bernstein
Musicals by Stephen Sondheim
Plays and musicals based on Romeo and Juliet
Plays set in New York City
Plays set in the 1950s
West End musicals
Musicals choreographed by Jerome Robbins
Teen musicals
Tony Award-winning musicals
Musicals by Arthur Laurents